Jarrett Walker (born 1962) is an American transit consultant and author. He has a consulting firm based in Portland, Oregon, that has worked on projects across North America, Europe, and Oceania. Walker is the author of the blog Human Transit and book of the same name.

Career 
In the 1970s, Walker became interested in transit issues while using Portland's TriMet bus system. He later worked as a planning intern at TriMet. 

Walker is the president of Jarrett Walker + Associates, a consultancy that contracts with public transit agencies. He and his firm have completed transit redesign projects in dozens of cities throughout the world, including Houston, Moscow, Auckland, and Dublin. 

The author has written several peer-reviewed papers, including "To Predict with Confidence", published in the Journal of Public Transportation in 2018, and "Purpose-Driven Public Transport," published in the Journal of Transport Geography in 2008. He has also been published in the peer-reviewed Shakespeare Quarterly. He has also written for Bloomberg CityLab and The Atlantic.

In December 2017, Walker attracted media attention after publicly feuding with billionaire Elon Musk. The Tesla CEO expressed his disdain for public transit and reiterated his preference for individual transportation in response to a conference audience question. Walker criticized him on Twitter, stating that "Musk's hatred of sharing space with strangers is a luxury (or pathology) that only the rich can afford." Musk responded with "You're an idiot", before saying: "Sorry... meant to say 'sanctimonious idiot.'" The dispute led to a broader debate about Musk's opinions on transit.

Walker's planning philosophy 
Walker frames discussions about public transportation in terms of an area's geometry and how it influences a transit network's ridership and coverage (also known as the "ridership-coverage trade-off"). He argued that an area's physical features (for example, the Bay Area's bay) significantly impact a transit network's ideal design and potential ridership.

Walker has argued that transit agencies' focus on predictions and new technologies distracts from necessary improvements to existing transportation systems. However, he has also stated that when working as a consulting planner, he views his role as "only stating geometric facts", or presenting potential designs for the agency employing him to consider. He typically presents a variety of designs, with some more heavily focused on increasing ridership and others more centered around increasing coverage. In Houston, Walker proposed creating a grid of bus routes with frequent service instead of focusing on expanding physical coverage, and the city ultimately implemented his recommendations, reporting an 11% increase in ridership on weekdays and a 30% increase on weekends a year later.

Walker has often asserted that "frequency is freedom" – frequent transit service helps people better access their communities, and that buses are often the most affordable way to expand transit service. To highlight the importance of service frequency, he said that a bus frequency of 15 minutes is as useless as a car that could only leave its home every 15 minutes.

In his book Human Transit, he lists seven requirements for a good public transit network:
 It takes me where I want to go – coverage
 It takes me when I want to go – span
 It's a good use of my time – frequency
 It's a good use of my money – price
 It respects me – cleanliness and safety
 I can trust it – reliability
 It gives me the freedom to change my plans – frequency again

Walker has criticized claims that modern ride-share services like Lyft and Uber are equivalent to or a potential replacement for public transit, arguing that rideshare services are much less efficient than even a relatively low-density bus service. As lockdowns resulting from the COVID-19 pandemic caused sharp reductions in ridership on transit, Walker was featured in a New York Times article as saying that transit is "not a business. And nowhere has that been more obvious than now. The sensible fiduciary thing to do would be to shut things down as quickly as possible, furlough the entire staff and wait. They’re not doing that because they’re expected to provide an essential service."

Walker's proposed redesigns have sometimes faced criticism from city residents, advocacy groups, or news agencies. In Dublin, Walker proposed consolidating the complex bus network into central "spines" with more frequent bus service. The public transit authority received over 72,000 comments from the public, of which a large portion criticized the proposal as service cuts, despite overall increases to both service frequency and geographic coverage. In addition, libertarian Randal O'Toole, a noted transit skeptic, has been a vocal critic of the implications of Jarrett Walker's work.

Personal life
Walker, who is gay, was raised in Portland, Oregon in the 1970s. He graduated with a bachelor's degree from Pomona College in 1980 and received his PhD in theater arts and humanities from Stanford University in 1996.

Bibliography

References

External links
Human Transit blog
Jarrett Walker + Associates
Walker's writing on JSTOR
To Predict with Confidence, Plan for Freedom

Living people
Transportation planning
American transportation businesspeople
Writers from Portland, Oregon
Stanford University alumni
Pomona College alumni
Shakespearean scholars
1962 births